Blytheville is the county seat and the largest city in Mississippi County, Arkansas, United States. The population was 13,406 at the 2020 census, down from 15,620 in 2010.

History
Blytheville was founded by Methodist clergyman Henry T. Blythe in 1879. It received a post office the same year, was incorporated in 1889, and became the county seat for the northern half of Mississippi County (Chickasawba District) in 1901. Blytheville received telephone service and electricity in 1903, and natural gas service in 1950.

Forestry was an early industry, spurred by the massive harvesting of lumber needed to rebuild Chicago following the Great Fire of 1871. The lumber industry brought sawmills and a rowdy crowd, and the area was known for its disreputable saloon culture during the 1880s and 1890s.

The cleared forests enabled cotton farming to take hold, encouraged by ongoing levee building and waterway management; the population grew significantly after 1900. On Blytheville's western edge lies one of the largest cotton gins in North America. Soybeans and rice have also become important crops.

The area around Blytheville continues to be farmed, though family farms have given way to large factory operations.

In the 1980s, Blytheville began to develop an industrial base, much of which centered on the steel industry.

Until 1991, Blytheville was home to Blytheville Air Force Base (renamed Eaker Air Force Base in 1988), a major airfield that was part of the Strategic Air Command.

James Sanders is Blytheville's mayor, the first African-American to serve in that position.

Geography
Blytheville is located in northeastern Arkansas and northeastern Mississippi County. It is the easternmost incorporated place in Arkansas.

Climate
The climate in this area is characterized by hot, humid summers and generally mild to cool winters.  According to the Köppen Climate Classification system, Blytheville has a humid subtropical climate, abbreviated "Cfa" on climate maps.

Demographics

2020 census

As of the 2020 United States Census, there were 13,406 people, 5,674 households, and 3,644 families residing in the city.

2010 census
As of the 2010 United States Census, there were 15,620 people living in the city. The racial makeup of the city was 55.9% Black, 38.8% White, 0.2% Native American, 0.8% Asian, 0.1% from some other race and 1.2% from two or more races. 3.0% were Hispanic or Latino of any race.

2000 census
As of the census of 2000, there were 18,272 people, 7,001 households, and 4,746 families living in the city. The racial makeup of the city was 45.15% White, 52.15% Black or African American, 0.19% Native American, 0.60% Asian, 0.07% Pacific Islander, 0.48% from other races, and 1.38% from two or more races. Hispanic or Latino of any race were 1.31% of the population.

There were 7,001 households, out of which 33.3% had children under the age of 18 living with them, 42.3% were married couples living together, 20.9% had a female householder with no husband present, and 32.2% were non-families. 28.1% of all households were made up of individuals, and 11.9% had someone living alone who was 65 years of age or older. The average household size was 2.57 and the average family size was 3.16.

In the city, the population was well distributed, with 29.9% under the age of 18, 10.4% from 18 to 24, 26.0% from 25 to 44, 19.6% from 45 to 64, and 14.1% who were 65 years of age or older. The median age was 33 years. For every 100 females, there were 86.5 males. For every 100 females age 18 and over, there were 81.3 males.

The median income for a household in the city was $26,683, and the median income for a family was $32,816. Males had a median income of $30,889 versus $20,710 for females. The per capita income for the city was $14,426. About 23.3% of families and 28.6% of the population were below the poverty line, including 42.2% of those under age 18 and 17.4% of those age 65 or over.

Blytheville's population continues to decline. The 2010 Census reported Blytheville's population at 15,620, and the 2014 Census estimate was 14,884. The 2015 City-data.com crime index for Blytheville, Arkansas is 946.2. The U.S. average is only 284.1.

Economy
Nucor Steel is the largest employer for both Blytheville and Mississippi County, with four locations (Nucor Yamato Steel, Nucor Steel Arkansas, Nucor Castrip, and Nucor Skyline). Nucor Steel Arkansas announced plans for a new cold mill in 2019. 

Aviation Repair Technologies (ART) is headquartered at Arkansas International Airport in Blytheville and employs approximately 120 employees. In February 2015, ART laid off between 50 and 75 employees.

Tenaris, a manufacturer and supplier of seamless and welded steel pipe products, operates 4 ERW (electric resistance welded) pipe manufacturing, threading and coating facilities. In January 2015, Tenaris laid off about 300 employees. In January 2016, Tenaris laid off 100 more employees.

Education

Blytheville Public Schools serves the majority of the city. The schools include:
 Blytheville Primary School (K-2)
 Blytheville Elementary School (3-5)
 Blytheville Middle School (6-8)
 Blytheville High School (9-12)

Other portions of the city limits are zoned to Armorel Public Schools and Gosnell Public Schools. The former operates Armorel High School and the latter operates Gosnell High School. In addition KIPP Delta operates the KIPP Delta Blytheville Charter School.

A Catholic school, Immaculate Conception School, operated in Blytheville until its 2007 closure.

Blytheville is home to Arkansas Northeastern College (formerly Mississippi County Community College until its merger with Cotton Boll Technical Institute).  It offers a two-year program, and is the United States' first community college with a solar photovoltaic prototype facility.

Infrastructure
Highways include: Interstate 55, U.S. Route 61, Highway 18, Highway 137, Highway 151, Highway 239, and Highway 239 Spur.

Notable people
 Julie Adams, film and television actress; grew up in Blytheville
 Fred Akers, football coach for the University of Texas Longhorns and Purdue Boilermakers; Blytheville native
 Lawrence Babits, archaeologist
 M. C. Burton Jr., professional basketball player and medical doctor
 Dee Clark, R&B singer known for his 1961 hit "Raindrops"; native of Blytheville
 Kimberly Derrick, short track speed skater and Olympic bronze medal winner
 Al Feldstein, Mad magazine editor; stationed in Blytheville during World War II and later wrote a science fiction story set in Blytheville entitled "Chewed Out", for Weird Science
 Bob Fisher, president of Belmont University since 2000
 George Hamilton, actor and grandson of Blytheville physician C.C. Stevens; spent his boyhood in Blytheville
 Eric Hill, professional football player
 Edgar H. Lloyd, WWII Congressional Medal of Honor recipient
 Bill Michael, head football coach at UTEP from 1977 to 1981
 Jermey Parnell, football player
 Cecil A. Partee, Chicago treasurer for three terms and the first African-American to serve both as President of the Illinois State Senate and Cook County's State Attorney
 Junior Walker, R&B singer and saxophonist
 Kathy Webb, member of Arkansas House of Representatives
 Barry Williamson, chairman of Texas Railroad Commission
 Jon Woods, Arkansas state senator and musician; spent part of his childhood in Blytheville
 Marvin Childers, state representative from Mississippi County from 2001 to 2006; attorney and lobbyist in Little Rock, formerly practiced in Blytheville
 Nannerl O. Keohane, former president of Duke; born in Blytheville
 Nick Symmonds, Olympic Track and Field runner; born in Blytheville 
 Jeff Taylor, professional basketball player
 Whiquitta Tobar, former college basketball player and lawyer
 Trent Tomlinson, country music artist
 Michael Utley, award-winning composer, singer and longtime member of Jimmy Buffett's Coral Reefer Band and Club Trini; graduate of Blytheville High School
 Ruth Whitaker, Arkansas state senator

References

Further reading
 Blytheville: Encyclopedia of Arkansas History & Culture

External links

 
 Blytheville Chamber of Commerce

 
Populated places established in 1879
Cities in Arkansas
Micropolitan areas of Arkansas
Cities in Mississippi County, Arkansas
County seats in Arkansas